Dehnow (also Romanized as Deh Now) is a village in Howmeh Rural District of the Central District of Borujen County, Chaharmahal and Bakhtiari province, Iran. At the 2006 census, its population was 1,301 in 318 households. The following census in 2011 counted 1,219 people in 341 households. The latest census in 2016 showed a population of 978 people in 305 households; it was the largest village in its rural district. The village is populated by Persians.

References 

Borujen County

Populated places in Chaharmahal and Bakhtiari Province

Populated places in Borujen County